Gao Siren (born March 1944 in Qingdao, Shandong) was the director of the Liaison Office of the Central People's Government in the Hong Kong Special Administrative Region from 2002 to 2009. From 2000 to 2002 he was the deputy director of the Liaison Office.

External links
Biography at China Vitae

Sources 

 

1944 births
Living people
Politicians from Qingdao
People's Republic of China politicians from Shandong
Chinese Communist Party politicians from Shandong
Members of the 16th Central Committee of the Chinese Communist Party
Alternate members of the 15th Central Committee of the Chinese Communist Party
Alternate members of the 14th Central Committee of the Chinese Communist Party
Members of the Standing Committee of the 11th National People's Congress
Delegates to the 10th National People's Congress
Hefei University of Technology alumni